Fifteenth: After All These Years is an extensive DVD by Bomb Factory. It contains 23 live performances, 8 music videos, 40 photos, and one bonus video with interviews and commentary scattered throughout the live and bonus footage.
The live "Puke" has commentary at the end in Japanese. Track 13 contains two versions of "Slickdrive", the first is video from a recording studio, the second is the official music video. "When the Wind Blows" contains footage of their tour in the United States. The track "Time" includes some band commentary and ends with the credits for the DVD. The release was produced by Bomb Factory and directed by Takanobu Nishimori and Rina Minamisawa.

Video listing

Live performances

Shows in Japan

"Jimmy's Backyard" – 3:22
"Down" – 2:50
"Remember" – 3:11
"How Do You Feel?" – 4:20
"Awaited Time" – 3:56
"She" – 3:49
"Take My Breath Away" – 3:21
"Deadly Silence Beach" – 2:13
"What's Goin' On" – 2:58
"Monster" – 3:07
"Free Chain" – 4:19
"Puke" (The Very Past) – 2:12
"Slickdrive" (Recording Scenes) – 5:23

Shows overseas

"When the Wind Blows" (Offshots) – 3:16
"Exciter" – 3:37
"Worst-Case" – 4:55
"Break Up" – 4:53
"Hangover" – 7:28
"Roller Coaster" – 4:42
"Dog-Race" (Featuring Maniacx) (Recorded in France) – 4:55
"Pilot Wire" – 2:54
"Discord" – 3:06
"Time" (Fifteenth: After All These Years) – 4:52

Singles

"Exciter" – 3:33
"Break Up" – 3:33
"Down" – 2:48
"Awaited Time" – 4:01
"Discord" – 3:00
"Pilot Wire" – 3:04
"All the Way" – 2:43
"Slickdrive" – 3:51

Extra videos

Bonus Track  – 23:10

Other features

In addition to video footage, there is also a photo collection containing many live concert shots.

References

Bomb Factory (band) video albums
2006 video albums
2006 live albums
Live video albums